Uxbridge High Street railway station in Uxbridge, England, was on what is now Oxford Road near its junction with Sanderson Road. It was the southern terminus and only station on the Great Western Railway (GWR) branch line from the GWR/GCR joint line, which is now the Chiltern Main Line.

History

The station opened on 1 May 1907, with the intention that the branch was to be extended across the town to a point just south of Uxbridge Vine Street railway station, the terminus of the GWR branch from West Drayton. Some land was purchased and the lines extended over High Street on a bridge, but the proposal was abandoned in 1914.

Services were suspended between January 1917 and May 1920.

The branch ran along the west side of Shire Ditch and Frays River and through the centre of the present Denham Country Park. A triangular junction with the main line at the north end connected west towards Denham and east towards West Ruislip. The three junctions were named Denham South, Denham West and Denham East. The curve between the South and East Junctions was little used, and closed during World War I.

The locations of the curves joining the main line can be seen in the landscape today, forming the northern perimeters of the park's northern lake and woodland adjacent to Uxbridge Golf Course.

The station closed to passengers on 25 September 1939, goods services continued until the station closed completely on 24 February 1964.

Most services from Uxbridge High Street ran to Denham via Denham West Junction, with some extended two stations further west to Gerrards Cross.

See also
 Uxbridge tube station
 List of London railway stations

References

Bibliography

External links
 www.railwayarchive.org.uk
 Uxbridge High Street station before opening, 1906
 Viaduct to Uxbridge High Street station, 1906
 Other side of Viaduct showing access to station, 1906
 Denham West junction with the main line looking east, 1907
 Denham East junction with the main line looking east, 1907
 Denham East junction with the main line looking west, 1907

Disused railway stations in the London Borough of Hillingdon
Former Great Western Railway stations
Railway stations in Great Britain opened in 1907
Railway stations in Great Britain closed in 1917
Railway stations in Great Britain opened in 1920
Railway stations in Great Britain closed in 1939
Former buildings and structures in the London Borough of Hillingdon
Uxbridge